Ghanongga is an Oceanic language spoken by about 2,500 people on the northern half of Ranongga Island, Solomon Islands.

References

Languages of the Solomon Islands
Northwest Solomonic languages